Rostranthera is a monotypic genus of flowering plants belonging to the family Melastomataceae. The only species is Rostranthera tetraptera.

Its native range is Suriname to Northern Brazil.

References

Melastomataceae
Monotypic Myrtales genera
Melastomataceae genera
Taxa named by Alfred Cogniaux